Paul Pei Junmin (born 2 February 1969) is a Chinese Catholic prelate and Metropolitan Archbishop of Shenyang since 2008.

Biography
Pei was born in Harqin Zuoyi Mongol Autonomous County, Liaoning in 1969, to a Catholic family. After graduating from Shenyang Catholic Seminary in 1990, he worked in the Sacred Heart of Jesus Cathedral, Shenyang. 

He was ordained a priest on May 31, 1992. In 1993, he went to study at the St. Charles Borromeo Seminary. 

He returned to China at the end of 1996 and that same year taught at Shenyang Catholic Seminary. On January 12, 2006, he was appointed coadjutor bishop of Liaoning (Shenyang) archdiocese by the Holy See and was honored pastoral post on May 7, 2006. On June 29, 2008, Bishop Pius Jin Pei-xian retired and Coadjutor Bishop Pei Junmin succeeded his position. In December 2010, he was elected vice-chairman of the Bishops Conference of Catholic Church in China (BCCCC) at the Eighth National Conference of Catholic Representatives in China.

References

1969 births
People from Chaoyang, Liaoning
Living people
St. Charles Borromeo Seminary alumni
21st-century Roman Catholic bishops in China